Janelle S. Bynum (born 1974/75) is an American Democratic politician, restaurateur, and former engineer serving as a member of the Oregon House of Representatives. She currently represents the 39th district, which covers northern Clackamas County, including most of Happy Valley and parts of Oregon City, unincorporated Milwaukie and the surrounding area. 

First elected to the legislature in 2016, Bynum previously represented the 51st district, which covered southern Multnomah County and northern Clackamas County, including the southeasternmost part of Portland, most of Happy Valley and Damascus, and the surrounding area.

Early life, education, and early career 
Bynum grew up in Washington, D.C. She graduated with a bachelor's degree in electrical engineering from Florida A&M University in 1996 and with a Master in Business Administration (MBA) from the University of Michigan in 2000.

As a student at Florida A&M University, Bynum received a scholarship from Boeing, and later served as a summer associate for the company. After graduating college, Bynum worked at General Motors as a steering systems engineer while pursing her MBA at University of Michigan.

While at General Motors, she was in Taiwan for a week following the 9/11 terrorist attacks's impact on air travel. Following this experience, in 2002, Bynum relocated to Clackamas County to help her mother-in-law run a McDonald’s franchise.

Political career 
In 2016, after incumbent Shemia Fagan opted not to seek re-election to her seat in Oregon House District 51, Bynum filed to run as a Democrat in the May 2016 primary election. Bynum won the Democratic primary for over Randy Shannon, a former member of the Damascus City Council, receiving 66% of the vote. In the general election, she defeated Republican candidate Lori Chavez-DeRemer, the mayor of Happy Valley, with 51% of the vote in what was considered one of the most competitive House races for the 2016 cycle. 

Bynum, who is Black, was reported to the police as a "suspicious person" while canvassing a neighborhood in her district in 2018.

In 2018, Bynum again faced Chavez-DeRemer, whom she defeated with 53% of the vote. In 2020, Bynum won re-election against Republican Jane Hays, a school administrator, and Libertarian candidate Donald Crawford.

In January 2022, after Tina Kotek resigned her position to focus on her run for Governor, Bynum ran for the position of Oregon Speaker of the House against Representative Dan Rayfield of Corvallis. In a closed-door meeting, Rayfield defeated Bynum for the Democratic Party's nomination for Speaker. Despite losing her party's nomination for Speaker, in February 2022, Bynum was the first Black person in Oregon's history to receive votes for Speaker of the House when she received four votes for Speaker.

In 2022, following redistricting, Bynum was drawn into the 39th District which no longer included East Portland and parts of Gresham and instead covered parts of unincorporated Clackamas County. Though the race was considered competitive by The Oregonian in early November 2022, she ultimately defeated Republican candidate Kori Haynes by a 10-point margin.

Personal life
Bynum and her husband, Mark, have four children. They own two restaurants in the area. She is a Christian.

Electoral history

2022

2020

2018

2016

External links
 Campaign website
 Legislative website

References

1970s births
Living people
People from Happy Valley, Oregon
Democratic Party members of the Oregon House of Representatives
Politicians from Washington, D.C.
21st-century American politicians
21st-century American women politicians
Women state legislators in Oregon
African-American state legislators in Oregon
African-American women in politics
University of Michigan alumni
Florida A&M University alumni
21st-century African-American women
21st-century African-American politicians
20th-century African-American people
20th-century African-American women
African-American history of Oregon